Erika Molnar (born 15 July 1976 in Budapest) is an athlete from Hungary, who competes in triathlon. Molnar competed at the first Olympic triathlon at the 2000 Summer Olympics.  She took twenty-third place with a total time of 2:05:39.50.

She competed again four years later at the 2004 Summer Olympics.  Her time of 2:17:53.38 put her in thirty-eighth place.

References

External links 
 
 
 
 

1976 births
Living people
Hungarian female triathletes
Triathletes at the 2000 Summer Olympics
Triathletes at the 2004 Summer Olympics
Olympic triathletes of Hungary
Sportspeople from Budapest
Duathletes